Naibe Reynoso is a television reporter and a member of the George Foster Peabody Awards board of jurors.

Naibe Reynoso is a journalist who has won two local Emmys and has been nominated several times. She has worked in Los Angeles, Phoenix and Denver, Colorado.  Most recently she hosted Hola L.A. on KCAL/CBS an English-language talk show with a Latina point of view.

References

External links
 

1973 births
Living people
American television personalities of Mexican descent
CNN people